Yom Kippur Katan ( translation from Hebrew: "Minor Day of Atonement"), is a practice observed by some Jews on the day preceding each Rosh Chodesh. The observance consists of fasting and supplication, but is much less rigorous than that of Yom Kippur proper.

Origin
The custom is of comparatively recent origin and is not mentioned in the Shulchan Aruch. It appears to have been inaugurated in the sixteenth century at Safed by the kabbalist Moses Cordovero, who called the fast Yom Kippur Katan; and it was included by Isaac Luria in his Seder ha-Tefillah. R. Isaiah Horowitz refers to it by that name, and says it should be observed by fasting and repentance: "Following the custom of the very pious, one must repent of his ways and make restitutions both in money and in personal acts, in order that he may enter the new month as pure as a new-born infant". When Rosh Chodesh occurs on Shabbat or Sunday, Yom Kippur Katan is observed on the preceding Thursday.

The custom has roots in scripture where a sin offering is sacrificed on Rosh Hodesh, indicating judgement and atonement is provided by God on that day. Therefore the idea of fasting would seem obvious. However, fasting is prohibited on Rosh Hodesh, so the fast is observed on the day prior to Rosh Hodesh.

Practices

Fasting is not obligatory and is only performed by the very pious.

The liturgy of the day, which consists of selichot, is recited at the Mincha prayer in the afternoon. In many communities, Tallit and tefillin are worn, especially by those who are fasting. If there are among the congregation ten persons who have fasted, they read the Torah reading Vayechal as on other fast days. The selichot are taken partly from the selichos of mincha from Yom Kippur, with the Viddui ha-Gadol (the great confession of sin by Rabbenu Nissim) and Ashamnu, and also a beautiful poem written for the occasion by Leon of Modena and beginning with Yom zeh. Some congregations add Avinu Malkenu. For the text of the Selichot see Baer,  Avodat Yisrael, pp. 317–319; Emden's Siddur Beit Ya'aḳov, ed. Warsaw, pp. 212a–216b.

Yom Kippur Katan is not observed on the day before Rosh Hashanah. It is not observed prior to Rosh Chodesh Cheshvan because Yom Kippur has just passed. It is not observed before Rosh Chodesh Tevet, because that day is Hanukkah. It is not observed prior to Rosh Chodesh Iyar, because one may not fast during Nisan.

As stated above, if the 29th of the month falls on a Friday or a Sabbath, Yom Kippur Katan is observed on the Thursday prior.

See also
 Isru chag refers to the day after each of the Three Pilgrimage Festivals.
 Chol HaMoed, the intermediate days of Passover and Sukkot.
 Mimouna, a traditional North African Jewish celebration held the day after Passover.
 Pesach Sheni, is exactly one month after 14 Nisan.
 Purim Katan is when during a Jewish leap year Purim is celebrated during Adar II so that the 14th of Adar I is then called Purim Katan.
 Shushan Purim falls on Adar 15 and is the day on which Jews in Jerusalem celebrate Purim.
 Yom tov sheni shel galuyot refers to the observance of an extra day of Jewish holidays outside of the land of Israel.

References

Further reading 
 Gershom Scholem (1972), Yom Kippur Katan, Encyclopedia Judaica
 Louis Jacobs (1995), Yom Kippur Katan, from The Jewish Religion: A Companion, Oxford: Oxford University Press 
 Shefa Gold (1989), The Dark Rays of the Moon: Yom Kippur Katan as Preparation for Rosh Chodesh

Hebrew names of Jewish holy days
Yom Kippur
Jewish fast days